Sonipat is a city & administrative headquarter in Sonipat district of Haryana state of India. It is also around 214 km (128 miles) southwest of Chandigarh, the state capital. The Yamuna River runs along the eastern boundary.

On 22 December 1972, Sonipat was created a full-fledged district. Sonipat Junction railway station is the main railway junction on Delhi-Kalka line. It lies on Delhi Western Peripheral Expressway, Eastern Peripheral Expressway (NE II) and Grand Trunk Road (NH 44) as well as the planned Delhi–Sonipat–Panipat Regional Rapid Transit System.

Etymology
According to legend, Sonipat was earlier known as Sonprastha, which later on became Swarnprastha (lit. 'Golden City'). Later, the name Swarnprastha changed into Swarnpath, and then to its current form, Sonipat.

History
Reference to the city comes in the epic Mahabharata as Swarnprastha. It was one of the five Prastha demanded by Pandavas as the price of peace from Duryodhan in lieu of the kingdom Hastinapur. The other four Prastha were Vanprastha (Panipat), Vyaghraprastha (Baghpat), Tilprastha (Faridabad) and Indraprastha (Delhi).

Sonipat is listed in the Ain-i-Akbari as a pargana under Delhi sarkar, producing a revenue of 7,727,323 dams for the imperial treasury and supplying a force of 1000 infantry and 70 cavalry. It had a brick fort at the time, which was also mentioned.

Sonipat came under Islamic rule after the Second Battle of Tarain in 1193. The Sikhs under Banda Singh Bahadur fought the Battle of Sonipat against the Mughals in 1709. Khanda, Sonipat village witnessed the Battle of Sonipat and won the battle against Mughals under the military leadership of Banda Singh Bahadur

Battle of Sonipat
The one and only battle fought in Sonipat was Battle of Sonipat. After taking blessings from Guru Gobind Singh, Baba Banda Singh Bahadur first camped at Khanda, Sonipat and assembled a fighting force with Dahiya Jats. Khanda, Sonipat village witnessed the Battle of Sonipat against Mughals and won the battle under the military leadership of Banda Singh Bahadur.

Geography and topography

Climate

Demographics
As of 2011 Indian Census, Sonipat city had a total population of 278,149, of which 148,364 were males and 129,785 were females. The population within the age group of 0 to 6 years was 32,333. The total number of literates in Sonipat was 210,112, which constituted 75.5% of the population with male literacy of 79.7% and female literacy of 70.8%. The effective literacy rate of 7+ population of Sonipat was 85.5%, of which the male literacy rate was 90.8% and the female literacy rate was 79.5%. The Scheduled Castes population was 42,013. Sonipat had 55,599 households in 2011.

The urban agglomeration, which includes suburbs outside of the city's jurisdiction, had a total population of 289,333.

Religion

City

Tehsil

Places of interest

Mughal architecture
There are several Mughal buildings on the outskirts of the city, including the Mosque of Abdullah Nasir-ud-din, who was a descendant from Mushid of Iran.

Yamuna River

The main water system in the district is the Yamuna River and the irrigation canals flowing out of it. The river flows besides the rural belt in the eastern side of district. It also acts as a natural boundary between the states of Haryana and Uttar Pradesh.

Economy

Industrial estates

There are six  HSIIDC industrial estates namely Sonepat city, Barhi, Kundli, Murthal and Rai. The development of Sonepat Industrial area in the city started in the 1950s with Atlas Cycle. Since then, many small and big industries have been established here. Atlas, E.C.E. or the Birla Factory, OSRAM India (formerly part of E.C.E., but in October 1998 it was acquired by OSRAM).

Education

Colleges
Central Institute of Petrochemicals Engineering & Technology

Universities
Indian Institute of Information Technology, Sonepat
Dr. B.R. Ambedkar National Law University, Sonipat (NLU)
National Institute of Food Technology Entrepreneurship and Management
Deenbandhu Chhotu Ram University Of Science and Technology
Ashoka University
O. P. Jindal Global University
Bhagat Phool Singh Mahila Vishwavidyalaya
SRM University, Haryana
World University of Design
Rishihood University

Primary and secondary schools
G3school

Sports
In July 1973 the government established the Motilal Nehru School of Sports, Rai, Sonipat to provide education facilities with extra emphasis on sports. It trains athletes in hockey, basketball, lawn tennis, horse riding, gymnastics, swimming, rifle shooting, volleyball, boxing, cricket and football.

Bus Port
Ministry of Road Transport and Highways proposed first Bus Port in the pattern of Airport on GT Road in Sector 7, Sonipat. It will be the joint venture of Government of Haryana and NHAI.

 In a first-of-its-kind initiative, the Union ministry of road transport and highways has decided to set up a bus port on the pattern of an airport in Sonipat.
 The proposed bus stand will be an ultra-modern ‘bus port’, with infrastructure at par with an international airport.
 To be constructed under design, built, finance, operate and transfer model, new bus ports will have digital display, variable message signboards, CCTV camera, surveillance system, deluxe waiting room, tourist information center, clock room, restaurant, food court, plaza, budget hotel, multiplex, administrative office, parcel room, maintenance workshop, fuel station, etc. facilities.

Municipal corporation
Sonipat Municipal Corporation is the governing civic body of the Urban Area in Sonipat. The Municipal Committee Sonipat was established in the year 1933.

Sonipat Lok Sabha
Sonipat (Lok Sabha constituency) is one of the 10 Lok Sabha (Parliamentary) constituencies in Haryana state in northern India.*Ramesh Chander Kaushik  is Member of Parliament from Sonipat Seat

Notable people

Rizak Ram Dahiya (MP Rajya Sabha)
Mohan Lal Badoli ( MLA & BJP Gen. Secretary)
Kushal Singh Dahiya (martyr)
Jat Mehar Singh Dahiya (martyr poet)
Hoshiar Singh Dahiya (PVC)
Bajrang Punia  (Bronze medalist Olympics, Wrestling)
Ravi Kumar Dahiya (Silver medalist Olympics, Wrestling)
Amit Kumar Dahiya (Olympian wrestler)
Vinod Kumar Dahiya (Olympian wrestler)
Seema Antil (discus thrower)
Sanchit Balhara (Bollywood score composer)
Preeti Bose (cricketer)
Manushi Chhillar, (actress, model and the winner of Miss World 2017)
Aakash Dahiya (Bollywood actor)
Jai Tirath Dahiya (leader)
Padam Singh Dahiya (politician)
Rohit Dahiya (cricketer)
Vikas Dahiya (Indian hockey player)
Vivek Dahiya (actor)
Yogeshwar Dutt (wrestler) 
Himanshu Malik (Bollywood actor)
Jitender Malik (politician)
Meghna Malik (actress)
Pardeep Narwal (kabbadi player)
Sanjay Pahal (cricketer)
Rajat Paliwal (cricketer)
Nisha Warsi (hockey player)

See also
 Battle of Sonipat
 Bahadurgarh
 Gurgaon
 Khanda

References

External links

 Official website

 
Cities and towns in Sonipat district
Satellite cities
Satellite Cities in India